Nirvanol, also known as ethylphenylhydantoin, is a derivative of hydantoin with anticonvulsant properties. Its 5-ethyl-5-phenyl substitution pattern is similar to that of phenobarbital. It is useful in the treatment of chorea.

Metabolism
Metabolism of nirvanol is stereoselective, with the (S)- enantiomer undergoing roughly 14 times more hydroxylation at the 4 position of the phenyl group than the (R)-enantiomer.

References

External links 
 Comparative Toxicogenomics Database: ethylphenylhydantoin
 MeSH Supplementary Concept Data: ethylphenylhydantoin

Anticonvulsants
Hydantoins
Phenyl compounds